The FC Steaua București football club has played 74 seasons in Liga I, which it has won 26 times. It has also won Cupa României 22 times, Supercupa României 6 times and Cupa Ligii twice – all competition records. In UEFA competitions the club has won the European Cup and European Super Cup, both in 1986. It has also reached the European Cup final in 1989, the final of the Intercontinental Cup, quarter-finals of the European Cup Winners' Cup, and the semi-finals of the UEFA Cup. Its players have won numerous awards and many of them have represented Romania in international competitions.

Overall seasons table in Liga I

Steaua in European and International competitions

Achievements

Domestic

Leagues
Liga I / Divizia A
Winners (26) – Record: 1951, 1952, 1953, 1956, 1959–60, 1960–61, 1967–68, 1975–76, 1977–78, 1984–85, 1985–86, 1986–87, 1987–88, 1988–89, 1992–93, 1993–94, 1994–95, 1995–96, 1996–97, 1997–98, 2000–01, 2004–05, 2005–06, 2012–13, 2013–14, 2014–15
Runners-up (19): 1954, 1957–58, 1962–63, 1976–77, 1979–80, 1983–84, 1989–90, 1990–91, 1991–92, 2002–03, 2003–04, 2006–07, 2007–08, 2015–16, 2016–17, 2017–18, 2018–19, 2020–21, 2021–22

Cups
Cupa României
Winners (24) – Record: 1948–49, 1950, 1951, 1952, 1955, 1961–62, 1965–66, 1966–67, 1968–69, 1969–70, 1970–71, 1975–76, 1978–79, 1984–85, 1986–87, 1987–88, 1988–89, 1991–92, 1995–96, 1996–97, 1998–99, 2010–11, 2014–15, 2019–20
Runners-up (8): 1953, 1963–64, 1976–77, 1979–80, 1983–84, 1985–86, 1989–90, 2013–14
Cupa Ligii
Winners (2) – Record: 2014–15, 2015–16
Supercupa României
Winners (6) – Record: 1994, 1995, 1998, 2001, 2006, 2013
Runners-up (6): 1999, 2005, 2011, 2014, 2015, 2020

European
European Cup / UEFA Champions League:
Winners (1): 1985–86
 Runners-up (1): 1988–89
 Semi-finalists (1): 1987–88

European Super Cup / UEFA Super Cup:
Winners (1): 1986

UEFA Cup / UEFA Europa League:
 Semi-finalists (1): 2005–06

European Cup Winners' Cup / UEFA Cup Winners' Cup:
 Quarter-finalists (2): 1971–72, 1992–93

International
Intercontinental Cup:
 Runners-up (1): 1986

Minor honours
The Autumn Cup:
 Winners (1): 1949
Dordrecht Tournament (Dordrecht-Holland):
 Winners (1): 1984
Bruges Matins: Link
 Winners (1): 1987
 Third Place (1): 1988
Norcia Winter Cup: Link
 Winners (1): 1999
 Runners-up (1): 2001
 Third Place (1): 2000
Torneo di Viareggio: Link
 Third Place (1): 1973
Trofeo Ciudad de La Línea (Cádiz-Spain): Link
 Runners-up (1): 1975
Joan Gamper Trophy (Barcelona-Spain): Link
 Runners-up (1): 1988
Teresa Herrera Trophy (La Coruña-Spain): Link
 Runners-up (1): 1989
Villa de Gijón Trophy: Link
 Third Place (1): 1984
Santiago Bernabéu Trophy: Link
 Third Place (1): 1986
Carlsberg Cup: Link
 Third Place (1): 1992
Ibrox International Challenge Trophy: Link
 Third Place (1): 1995

Honours

Awards

Top scorer

(*) Title shared.

Other awards

Highest transfer fees received

Records

Others

 Record League Percentage in a Season: 65 pts in 34 matches (1988–89; 2 pts/win; %);
 Most Goals Scored in a Season: 121 (1988–89; 3,55/match);
 Fewest Goals Conceded in a Season: 16 (2005–06; 0,53/match);
 Most Appearances: Tudorel Stoica (369 matches in 14 seasons);
 Most Goals Scored: Anghel Iordănescu (155 goals in 14 seasons);
 Negative Record: 13 matches without victory in LI, UCL, CR, (from 26 September 2008 to 22 November 2008)
 Youngest goal scorer in European cups: Răzvan Ochiroșii: 17 years, 4 months and 20 days (2 August 2006 v ND Gorica);

National
 Record Unbeaten League Run: 104 matches (June 1986 – September 1989) World record;
 Record Home Unbeaten League Run: 112 matches (November 1989 – August 1996);
 Record League Percentage in a Season: 65 pts in 34 matches (1988–89; 2 pts/win; 95,58%);
 Most Goals Scored in a Season: 121 (1988–89; 3,55/match);
 Most seasons in UEFA Champions League Group Stage for a Romanian Team - 7 (1994–95, 1995–96, 1996–97, 2006–07, 2007–08, 2008–2009, 2013–2014);
 The only Romanian club to have made it in the European spring for three seasons in a row (2004–05, 2005–06, 2006–07);
 Most trophies in Romanian football: 52;
 Most National Championships: 25;
 Most National Cups: 21;
 Most National Supercups: 6;
 Most championships in a row: 6 (1992-93 – 1997-98, equal to Chinezul Timișoara's record from the 1920s);
 Most matches won in a row in Divizia A: 17 (equal to Dinamo București);
 Steaua (66 seasons) and FC Dinamo București (65 seasons) are the only clubs to have played only in the first Romanian league;
 For 17 years, no other team from Romania has managed to advance any further than Steaua in European club competitions (not counting the two seasons when Steaua didn't manage to qualify for Europe);
 Most national championships won by a single player: Marius Lăcătuș (10);

International
 Record Unbeaten League Run: 104 matches (June 1986 – September 1989) World Record;
 The first Eastern European team and the only team from a communist country to win the European Cup;
 Best penalty shootout performance inside European competitions: Helmuth Duckadam, saving all four penalties in the ECC Final in 1986.

Players

Liga I appearances (top 10)

As of 31 August 2006. Appearances adds from official book (p. 374–385).

Liga I top scorers (top 10)

As of 14 May 2022

Liga I full season appearances

Brothers who played for Steaua

Romanian football clubs records and statistics